The vampire lifestyle, vampire subculture, or vampire community (sometimes spelt as "vampyre") is an alternative lifestyle and subculture based around the mythology of and popular culture based on vampires. Those within the subculture commonly identify with or as vampires, with participants typically taking heavy inspiration from media and pop culture based on vampiric folklore and legend, such as the gothic soap opera Dark Shadows, the tabletop role-playing game Vampire: The Masquerade, and the book series The Vampire Chronicles by author Anne Rice. Practices within the vampire community range from blood-drinking from willing donors to organising groups known as 'houses' and 'courts' of self-identified vampires. 

The vampire subculture largely stemmed from the goth subculture, but also incorporates some elements of the sadomasochism subculture. The Internet provides a prevalent forum of communication for the subculture, along with other media such as glossy magazines devoted to the topic.

Participants within the subculture range from those who dress as vampires but understand themselves to be human, to those who assert a need to consume either blood or 'human energy'. Both types of vampires may assert that the consumption of blood or energy (sometimes referred to as auric or pranic energy) is necessary for spiritual or physical nourishment.

Though the vampire subculture has considerable overlap with gothic subculture, the vampire community also has overlap with both therian and otherkin communities, and are considered by some to be a part of both, despite the difference in cultural and historical development.

Types of vampire lifestylers
There are several types of vampire lifestylers:

 "": (sometimes referred to as hematophages) consume the blood of others
 "Psychic vampires": claim to attain nourishment from the aura or pranic energy of others in order to balance a spiritual or psychological energy deficiency, such as a damaged aura or chakra
 "Hybrids": both consume blood and assert that they consume psychic energy
 "Blood donors": willingly allow other members of the subculture to drink their blood, and may or may not exhibit subservience toward those who do
 "": use blood as a stimulant or sexual fetish, sometimes drinking it during the course of sadomasochistic sex
 "Role-players" or "lifestylers": acknowledge that they are human beings roleplaying as vampires. Williams states that they may "dress up in vampire clothing, live a vampire lifestyle (e.g. sleep in coffins), and primarily participate in RPGs such as Vampire: The Masquerade"

Explanations for blood-drinking 
Renfield syndrome is a clinical condition marked by a fixation on blood or blood-drinking.

Sex researchers have also documented cases of people with sexual (paraphilic) vampirism and autovampirism.

Controversy

Christianity 
Some self-proclaimed Christian vampire slayers have arisen in response to the vampire subculture. Online, they swarm vampire websites with hate mail and participate in other similar activities.

References

Further reading
Belanger, Michelle A. (2004). The Psychic Vampire Codex: A Manual of Magick and Energy Work. Red Wheel/Weiser. 
 
Laycock, Joseph (2009). Vampires Today: The Truth About Modern Vampirism. Praeger. 
Russo, Arlene (2005). Vampire Nation. John Blake. 

 Peter Day (Hrsg.): Vampires: myths and metaphors of enduring evil- Editions Rodopi, 2006, 

Vampirism
Goth subculture
Lifestyles